The Niagarette River is a stream flowing in the municipalities of Saint-Ubalde, Saint-Thuribe and Saint-Casimir, in the Portneuf Regional County Municipality, in the administrative region of Capitale-Nationale, in Quebec, in Canada.

The surface of the Niagarette River (except the rapids zones) is generally frozen from the beginning of December to the end of March, but the safe circulation on the ice is generally made from the end of December to the beginning of March.

Geography 

The Niagarette river takes its source from a small unidentified lake (altitude of ), located in a forest area in the eastern part of the municipality of Saint-Ubalde.

The Niagarette river flows according to the following segments:
  to the west;
  east to the limit of the forest area;
  south-east to the confluence of the Rang Saint-David River (coming from the west);
  towards the south-east, meandering in an agricultural area to the chemin du 3e rang in Saint-Thuribe;
  towards the south-east by meandering in agricultural area to the railway bridge;
  to the southeast by winding through an agricultural zone and cutting the route 363 until the confluence of the Petite rivière Niagarette (coming from the west);
  to the east, forming a few loops passing south of the village of Saint-Casimir, to its mouth.

From there, the current descends on  southwards following the course of the Sainte-Anne River, to the northwest bank of St. Lawrence River.

Agriculture covers 60% of the river basin. This is the Sainte-Anne River sub-basin whose land use is most agricultural.

History 
Two major floods have been reported in the history of the Niagarette River, in 1939 and in 1973. On August 10, 1939, the erosion of the banks of the Niagarette river had damaged the low walls of cement and the rip-rap of the banks near the buildings south of the village of Saint-Casimir. This sudden flood also damaged the route 363 and swept away the residences of the families of Réjean Lépine and Rolland Duchesneau, located near the course of the river as well as part of their respective terrain. The houses of MM. Victorin Naud and Lévis Tessier were also damaged.

On October 29, 1986, the Gazette officielle du Québec published decree 1512–86 at the request of the municipality of Saint-Casimir for the reconstruction of a dam for the purpose of aqueduct on the bed of the Niagarette river.

In 1998, the municipality of Saint-Casimir had a project to divert the Niagarette river by giving it a more rectilinear route in order to resolve its flooding problems. The Niagarette river then had a meander more than 200 meters long, suitable for the formation of ice jams during the snowmelt.

Toponymy 
The spelling of the toponym occasionally took the form "Naigarette River" dating back to the end of the 19th century and perhaps even before. This toponym could be explained as being a diminutive of the famous Niagara Falls. The term Iroquois niagara means "to resonate", "to make noise".

The toponym "Niagarette River" was formalized on August 17, 1978, at the Place Names Bank of the Commission de toponymie du Québec.

See also 
 Petite rivière Niagarette
 List of rivers of Quebec

References

Bibliography

External links 
 CAPSA

Rivers of Capitale-Nationale